John of Aragon (1304–1334, Pobo, Saragossa) was a prince of Aragon. He was the son of James II of Aragon and his second wife Blanche of Anjou. He was archbishop of Toledo from 1319 until 1328. He became archbishop of Tarragona in 1327 and Latin Patriarch of Alexandria in 1328, holding both posts until his death.

External links
https://web.archive.org/web/20190505103343/https://www.enciclopedia.cat/search/404/fitxa%20v2%20jsp

House of Aragon
Archbishops of Tarragona
Archbishops of Toledo
1304 births
1334 deaths
Sons of kings